James Francis "Jock" McHale, (12 December 1882 – 4 October 1953) was an Australian rules football player and coach for the Collingwood Football Club in the Victorian Football League in a marathon career that extended from 1903 to 1949.

Early life 
The son of an Irish-born policeman, John Francis, and his wife Mary (née Gibbons), the young McHale was born in Sydney, New South Wales, but moved to Melbourne with his family at age 5. He attended St Brigid's primary school in North Fitzroy and St Paul's in Coburg, then moved on to Christian Brothers' College (Parade) in East Melbourne and completed three years of secondary school. Having just turned 15, he left school to take a position with the McCracken Brewery.

Playing career 
McHale joined Coburg, at the time a junior club, and came to prominence with his consistency, which led to an invitation to play at Collingwood. McHale made his league debut in 1903 for Collingwood, playing as a half-back before moving into the centre. Durability was the cornerstone of his reputation as a player—he set a VFL record by playing 191 games consecutively between 1906 and 1917. This record was not beaten until 1943 by Richmond's Jack Titus. He served as captain-coach from 1912–1913 and as a playing coach from 1914 up to the 1917 premiership, his second premiership after being part of the 1910 premiership side. McHale played a handful of matches in 1918 and 1920, but from 1918 to 1949 he made his name as the most successful coach in VFL/AFL history, deeds for which he is best remembered. As a player, McHale played 261 games and kicked 18 goals, as well as representing Victoria.

Coaching career 
In total, McHale coached 714 VFL games with 467 wins and 10 draws (a 66.1% winning rate). This included a record 59 finals matches and 16 Grand Finals for eight premierships. His tally of 714 games was the record for most VFL/AFL games coached until 2015, when it was passed by Footscray, West Coast, Collingwood and Carlton coach Mick Malthouse. Stylistically, he was regarded more for his analytical and ability to inspire, rather than as a teacher of skills. His football brain earned him the respect of his players and the football public.  His stint as coach encompassed three enormously successful eras: 1917–1922 (five Grand Finals in six years for two flags), then 1925–1930 (six successive Grand Finals for four flags) and finally 1935–1939 (five successive Grand Finals for two flags).

The strength of Collingwood under McHale lay in its evenness and adherence to team discipline. McHale fashioned the team as a machine, with no part bigger than the whole – he and his players accepted the same amount of pay every week. He placed great store in his own ability to pick players' strengths and fitness levels and he would assess his players each week during a traditional Thursday night match-day type training. Although in the years before and after the war Collingwood earned a reputation for failing in tough finals matches, McHale's reputation is assured for guiding the club in achieving VFL football's greatest single feat: the unequalled record of four premierships in a row, set between 1927 and 1930.

During the war, Collingwood fell on its first barren period since the formation of the club in 1892. McHale rode out the privations of the period and the Magpies re-emerged as a contender in 1945. However, the club suffered a series of disappointing finals losses, and McHale conceded to age early in 1950 and retired. He stayed intimately involved with the club and helped plan the Magpies' successful campaign in the 1953 Grand Final. When Collingwood won the match to end a premiership drought of 17 years, McHale was overwhelmed with emotion. The next day he suffered a heart attack, and he died on 4 October at his home in Coburg (noted Collingwood benefactor John Wren suffered a heart attack while watching the same final match, and he died on 26 October 1953).

Coaching statistics

|- style="background-color: #EAEAEA"
! scope="row" style="font-weight:normal"|1912
|
| 18 || 9 || 9 || 0 || 50.0% || 7 || 10
|-
! scope="row" style="font-weight:normal"|1913
|
| 19 || 13 || 6 || 0 || 68.4% || 3 || 10
|- style="background-color: #EAEAEA"
! scope="row" style="font-weight:normal"|1914
|
| 18 || 10 || 7 || 1 || 58.3% || 5 || 10
|-
! scope="row" style="font-weight:normal"|1915
|
| 18 || 14 || 4 || 0 || 77.8% || 1 || 9
|- style="background-color: #EAEAEA"
! scope="row" style="font-weight:normal"|1916
|
| 13 || 6 || 6 || 1 || 50.0% || 2 || 4
|-
! scope="row" style="font-weight:normal"|1917
|
| 16 || 12 || 5 || 1 || 69.4% || 1 || 6
|- style="background-color: #EAEAEA"
! scope="row" style="font-weight:normal"|1918
|
| 16 || 11 || 5 || 0 || 68.8% || 2 || 8
|-
! scope="row" style="font-weight:normal"|1919
|
| 19 || 15 || 4 || 0 || 80.0% || 1 || 9
|- style="background-color: #EAEAEA"
! scope="row" style="font-weight:normal"|1920
|
| 19 || 12 || 7 || 0 || 63.2% || 4 || 9
|-
! scope="row" style="font-weight:normal"|1921
|
| 17 || 9 || 8 || 0 || 52.9% || 3 || 9
|- style="background-color: #EAEAEA"
! scope="row" style="font-weight:normal"|1922
|
| 18 || 12 || 6 || 0 || 66.7% || 1 || 9
|-
! scope="row" style="font-weight:normal"|1923
|
| 16 || 8 || 7 || 1 || 53.1% || 5 || 9
|- style="background-color: #EAEAEA"
! scope="row" style="font-weight:normal"|1924
|
| 16 || 8 || 8 || 0 || 50.0% || 6 || 9
|-
! scope="row" style="font-weight:normal"|1925
|
| 20 || 14 || 6 || 0 || 70.0% || 4 || 12
|- style="background-color: #EAEAEA"
! scope="row" style="font-weight:normal"|1926
|
| 20 || 15 || 5 || 0 || 75.0% || 1 || 12
|-
! scope="row" style="font-weight:normal"|1927
|
| 20 || 17 || 3 || 0 || 85.0% || 1 || 12
|- style="background-color: #EAEAEA"
! scope="row" style="font-weight:normal"|1928
|
| 21 || 17 || 3 || 1 || 83.3% || 1 || 12
|-
! scope="row" style="font-weight:normal"|1929
|
| 20 || 19 || 1 || 0 || 95.0% || 1 || 12
|- style="background-color: #EAEAEA"
! scope="row" style="font-weight:normal"|1930
|
| 20 || 16 || 4 || 0 || 80.0% || 1 || 12
|-
! scope="row" style="font-weight:normal"|1931
|
| 19 || 12 || 7 || 0 || 63.2% || 4 || 12
|- style="background-color: #EAEAEA"
! scope="row" style="font-weight:normal"|1932
|
| 20 || 15 || 5 || 0 || 75.0% || 3 || 12
|-
! scope="row" style="font-weight:normal"|1933
|
| 18 || 11 || 7 || 0 || 61.1% || 6 || 12
|- style="background-color: #EAEAEA"
! scope="row" style="font-weight:normal"|1934
|
| 19 || 13 || 5 || 1 || 71.1% || 4 || 12
|-
! scope="row" style="font-weight:normal"|1935
|
| 21 || 16 || 3 || 2 || 81.0% || 2 || 12
|- style="background-color: #EAEAEA"
! scope="row" style="font-weight:normal"|1936
|
| 20 || 17 || 3 || 0 || 85.0% || 2 || 12
|-
! scope="row" style="font-weight:normal"|1937
|
| 21 || 15 || 6 || 0 || 71.4% || 3 || 12
|- style="background-color: #EAEAEA"
! scope="row" style="font-weight:normal"|1938
|
| 21 || 14 || 7 || 0 || 66.7% || 4 || 12
|-
! scope="row" style="font-weight:normal"|1939
|
| 21 || 16 || 5 || 0 || 76.2% || 2 || 12
|- style="background-color: #EAEAEA"
! scope="row" style="font-weight:normal"|1940
|
| 18 || 8 || 10 || 0 || 44.4% || 8 || 12
|-
! scope="row" style="font-weight:normal"|1941
|
| 18 || 12 || 6 || 0 || 66.7% || 5 || 12
|- style="background-color: #EAEAEA"
! scope="row" style="font-weight:normal"|1942
|
| 14 || 2 || 12 || 0 || 14.3% || 10 || 11
|-
! scope="row" style="font-weight:normal"|1943
|
| 15 || 5 || 10 || 0 || 33.3% || 10 || 11
|- style="background-color: #EAEAEA"
! scope="row" style="font-weight:normal"|1944
|
| 18 || 7 || 11 || 0 || 38.9% || 10 || 12
|-
! scope="row" style="font-weight:normal"|1945
|
| 22 || 15 || 7 || 0 || 68.2% || 2 || 12
|- style="background-color: #EAEAEA"
! scope="row" style="font-weight:normal"|1946
|
| 22 || 13 || 8 || 1 || 61.4% || 2 || 12
|-
! scope="row" style="font-weight:normal"|1947
|
| 19 || 11 || 7 || 1 || 60.5% || 5 || 12
|- style="background-color: #EAEAEA"
! scope="row" style="font-weight:normal"|1948
|
| 21 || 14 || 7 || 0 || 66.7% || 3 || 12
|-
! scope="row" style="font-weight:normal"|1949
|
| 20 || 13 || 7 || 0 || 65.0% || 3 || 12
|- class="sortbottom"
! colspan=2| Career totals
! 713
! 466
! 237
! 10
! 66.1%
! colspan=2|
|}

Recognition
In 1996, Jock McHale was inducted into the Australian Football Hall of Fame and then was elevated to legend status in 2005.

Since 2001, the premiership coach is awarded the Jock McHale Medal, in honour of McHale's brilliant coaching record. The AFL has retrospectively made this award to each premiership coach since 1950, the year after McHale retired as a coach.

Crime novelist Kerry Greenwood wrote the 1991 short story The Vanishing of Jock McHale's Hat. It was adapted into a season 2 episode of Miss Fisher's Murder Mysteries, titled "Marked for Murder", which aired in 2013.

1930 Grand Final
The AFL officially recognises McHale as having coached 714 games and eight premierships, but it is a matter of some historical controversy that the 1930 Grand Final and premiership are credited to McHale's statistics. McHale had coached the team throughout that year and into the week of the Grand Final, but he was absent on the day of the Grand Final, having fallen ill with influenza days before the game. Club treasurer Bob Rush performed the match-day coaching duties in his place. For many years, Rush was credited with having coached the game; but, after a decision in 2014 by the AFL's historians, McHale is now credited as Collingwood's sole coach in the game.

Death
Jock McHale died of a heart attack on 4 October 1953, aged 70, at his home in Coburg, only a week after Collingwood had won its first premiership in seventeen years. He is buried with his wife Violet, son James, and daughter Mary.

McHale is buried at Coburg Cemetery, Preston, Victoria. His grave is included in a self-guided heritage walk at the cemetery, and information about his life is available on a sign posted at his graveside.

References

External links

 James Francis McHale at the Australian Dictionary of Biography
 
 
 Collingwood Football Club Hall of Fame
 Jock McHale's playing statistics from AFL Tables
 Jock McHale's coaching statistics from AFL Tables

1882 births
1953 deaths
Australian rules footballers from Sydney
Australian rules footballers from Melbourne
Australian Rules footballers: place kick exponents
Collingwood Football Club players
Collingwood Football Club Premiership players
Collingwood Football Club coaches
Collingwood Football Club Premiership coaches
Australian Football Hall of Fame inductees
Australian people of Irish descent
Two-time VFL/AFL Premiership players
Sport Australia Hall of Fame inductees
Eight-time VFL/AFL Premiership coaches